This article displays the rosters for the participating teams at the 1984 Tournament of the Americas played in São Paulo, Brazil from May 15 to May 24, 1984.

Argentina

4 Esteban Camisassa
5 Daniel Aréjula
6 Jorge Faggiano
7 Rubén Fernández
8 Carlos Romano
9 Sebastián Uranga
10 Adolfo Perazzo
11 Miguel Cortijo
12 Eduardo Cadillac
13 Gabriel Milovich
14 Luis Oroño
15 Luis González
Head coach:  Heriberto Schonwies

Brazil

4 Nilo
5 Sílvio
6 Gerson
7 Carioquinha
8 Cadum
9 Marquinhos
10 Paulinho
11 Rolando
12 Adilson
13 Marcelo
14 Oscar
15 Israel
Head coach:  Cláudio Mortari

Canada

4 Howie Kelsey
5 Tony Simms
6 Eli Pasquale
7 Karl Tilleman
8 Gerald Kazanowski
9 Jay Triano
10 John Hatch
11 Gordon Herbert
12 Bill Wennington
13 Romel Raffin
14 Greg Wiltjer
15 Dan Meagher
Head coach: / Jack Donohue

Cuba

4 Pedro Abreu
5 Alberto Maturel
6 Roberto Simón
7 Noángel Luaces
8 Eduardo Cabrera
9 Raúl Dubois
10 Leonardo Pérez
11 Heriberto Lamerte
12 Tomás Herrera
13 Daniel Scott
14 Jorge Moré
15 Félix Morales
Head coach:  Pedro Chappé

Dominican Republic

4 Máximo Tapia
5 Víctor Hansen
6 Evaristo Pérez Carrión
7 Luis Cruz
8 Tony Sánchez
9 José Domínguez
10 Winston Royal
11 Vinicio Muñoz
12 Víctor Chacón
14 José Vargas
15 Julián McKelly
Head coach:  Fernando Teruel

Mexico

4 Rafael Pineda
5 Víctor Flores
6 Julio Gallardo
7 Rafael Palomar
8 Guillermo Bayler
9 Óscar Ruiz
10 Enrique Ortega
11 Antonio Esquivel
12 Arturo Sánchez
13 José Luis Arroyos
14 Rafael Holguín
15 Norberto Mena
Head coach:  Gustavo Saggiante

Panama

4 Tito Malcolm
5 Eddy Chávez
6 Enrique Grenald
7 Braulio Rivas
8 Mark Forbes
9 Alfonso Smith
10 Edgar Macías
11 Rolando Frazer
12 Rodolfo Gil
13 Cedric Bailey
14 Adolfo Medrick
15 Mario Butler
Head coach:  Carl Pirelli-Minetti

Puerto Rico

4 Orlando Marrero
5 Richie Hernández
6 José Sosa
7 Wesley Correa
8 Rubén Rodríguez
9 Willie Quiñones
10 Angelo Cruz
11 Ángel Santiago
12 Mario Morales
13 Néstor Cora
14 Jerome Mincy
15 José Ortiz
Head coach:  Julio Toro

Uruguay

4 Horacio López
5 Luis Larrosa
6 Luis Pierri
7 Hébert Núñez
8 Wilfredo Ruiz
9 Horacio Perdomo
10 Carlos Peinado
11 Walter Pagani
12 Julio Pereyra
13 Álvaro Tito
14 Juan Mignone
15 Víctor Frattini
Head coach:  Ramón Etchamendi

Bibliography

External links
1984 American Olympic Qualifying Tournament for Men at fiba.com

FIBA AmeriCup squads